Philotheca brevifolia is a species of flowering plant in the family Rutaceae and is endemic to a small area in south-western New South Wales. It is a spreading shrub with fleshy, sessile, cylindrical leaves and white to pink flowers arranged singly or in small groups on the ends of branchlets.

Description
The ten stamens are free from each other with a prominent appendage on the anther.

Taxonomy
This philotheca was first formally described in 1837 by Stephan Endlicher from an unpublished description by Allan Cunningham who gave it the name Eriostemon brevifolius. Endlicher published the description in the Enumeratio plantarum quas in Novae Hollandiae ora austro-occidentali ad fluvium Cygnorum et in sinu Regis Georgii collegit Carolus Liber Baro de Hügel. The type specimens were collected by Cunningham on "barren ground at the base of Peel's Range, interior of N.S.W." in June 1817. In 1998, Wilson changed the name to Philotheca brevifolia in the journal Nuysia.

Distribution and habitat
Philotheca brevifolia usually grows in mallee and is only known in a restricted area near Griffith in New South Wales.

References

brevifolia
Flora of New South Wales
Sapindales of Australia
Plants described in 1837
Taxa named by Allan Cunningham (botanist)
Taxa named by Stephan Endlicher